Abdul-Adeem Karjimi is a Moroccan footballer currently playing for Al-Nasr in the Omani League, previously playing there for four seasons.

Club career
From 2011 to 2012 he played for Emirati club, Al Rams.

He played for Al Jahra SC, from 2010 to 2011.

In his current club Al-Nasr, where he previously played, for four seasons, and has received best player of the Omani League in 2007/2008.  Throughout his career with Al-Nasr he has worn the number 7 shirt.

References

External links
Allesfuerdenfussball profile

Abdul-Adeem Karjimi montage (Al-Nasr TV)
Abdul-Adeem Karjimi montage (Fan-made)

Moroccan footballers
Living people
Year of birth missing (living people)
Al-Nasr SC (Salalah) players
Emirati people of Moroccan descent
Association footballers not categorized by position